The Midnight Special is a 1931 pre-Code sound film produced and released by independent film maker Chesterfield. It was directed by Duke Worne and starred Glenn Tryon and Merna Kennedy.

The film is preserved at the Library of Congress.

Cast
Glenn Tryon as Gerald Boone
Merna Kennedy as Ellen Harboard
Mary Carr as Mrs. Boone
Phillips Smalley as Mr. Harboard
Jimmy Aubrey as Joe
Tom O'Brien as Dan Padden
Norman Phillips Jr. as Billy

References

External links
The Midnight Special at IMDb.com

1931 films
American independent films
1931 drama films
American drama films
American black-and-white films
Chesterfield Pictures films
1930s independent films
Films directed by Duke Worne
1930s American films